Ancel was a brand under which Uruguayan government-owned telecommunications company Antel provided mobile phone services since  1 September 1994. As of 2015, Ancel is no longer in use, having been replaced by Antel.

References 

Telecommunications companies of Uruguay
Telecommunications companies established in 1994
Uruguayan brands

es:ANTEL#Telefonía móvil